Jiří Balaštík (born 31 May 1951) is a Czech basketball player. He competed in the men's tournament at the 1972 Summer Olympics.

References

1951 births
Living people
Czech men's basketball players
Olympic basketball players of Czechoslovakia
Basketball players at the 1972 Summer Olympics
Place of birth missing (living people)